Margaret Elizabeth Ellison is an American film producer and entrepreneur. She is the founder of Annapurna Pictures, established in 2011. She produced the films Zero Dark Thirty (2012), Her (2013), American Hustle (2013), and Phantom Thread (2017), all of which have earned her Oscar nominations. In 2014, Ellison was included in the annual Time 100 list of the most influential people in the world. She also received a Tony Award for Best Musical as a producer for the musical A Strange Loop.

Early life and education
Megan Ellison was born in Santa Clara County, California, the daughter of Oracle Corporation co-founder and chairman, multibillionaire Larry Ellison, and his ex-wife, Barbara Boothe Ellison. Her father is of Jewish and Italian descent. She has a brother, film producer David Ellison, who founded Skydance Media. Ellison graduated from Sacred Heart Preparatory in 2004 and attended film school at the University of Southern California for one year.

Early work
Ellison landed her first film credit in 2005 as a boom operator for the short film When All Else Fails, a thriller written and directed by her brother David Ellison. Ellison then began to finance low-budget movies such as Waking Madison and Passion Play. The success of the Coen Brothers' True Grit in 2010, on which she worked as an executive producer, brought her attention and credibility and launched her career as a producer.

Career
Ellison started out in the film business in 2006 when she contacted Katherine Brooks, the writer and director of Loving Annabelle, about investing in the filmmaker's next movie. The duo made plans for Waking Madison, starring Elisabeth Shue, which told the story of a woman who tries to cure her multiple personality disorder by locking herself in a room without food for 30 days. Ellison financed the film that was reported to have a budget of $2 million. Principal photography took place in 2007.  It screened at the Newport Beach Film Festival in 2011 and went straight to DVD in July of that year.

Ellison provided some financing for more movies in 2008 and 2009. The first was Main Street starring Colin Firth. It received little attention at film festivals and failed to gain general release. Passion Play, also made in 2009, got a release but fared poorly at the box office despite a well-known cast of popular actors. However, her investment in the Coen brothers western remake True Grit paid off as that movie found major commercial and critical success when released at the end of 2010.

After that, Ellison received access to much larger sums of money from her father for the production of more movies and partnered with Michael Benaroya to produce and cofinance the thriller Catch .44 starring Bruce Willis and Forest Whitaker, and John Hillcoat's Prohibition-era crime drama, Lawless. Around that same time, she began to collaborate with the Creative Artists Agency's film finance group headed by Roeg Sutherland and Micah Green.

She has since founded Annapurna Pictures, a company that plans to take a so-called "Silicon Valley" approach to filmmaking by investing in original, daring movies made by prestigious directors and screenwriters. Believing that risk-averse Hollywood studios have largely abandoned sophisticated dramas, period pieces, and auteur cinema, Annapurna Productions has released Paul Thomas Anderson's The Master, a period drama about a cult that resembles Scientology, starring Joaquin Phoenix and Philip Seymour Hoffman, and Zero Dark Thirty, an action-thriller about the killing of Osama bin Laden from writer Mark Boal and director Kathryn Bigelow, who made the Oscar-winning movie, The Hurt Locker.

In 2011 and 2012, it was reported that Ellison was working with Boal on developing a movie about WikiLeaks founder Julian Assange based on a New York Times Magazine article called "The Boy Who Kicked the Hornet's Nest" by former New York Times executive editor Bill Keller. Amid fierce competition in 2012 among movie studios to produce an Assange biopic, Ellison and Annapurna eventually did not produce the movie, but DreamWorks released The Fifth Estate in 2013.

In 2011, Ellison outbid Lionsgate for the rights to the Terminator franchise. In January 2014, Ellison removed Annapurna Productions from the reboot of the Terminator franchise.

In 2014, Ellison became the first woman and the fourth person to receive two Academy Award nominations for Best Picture in the same year, which she received for her work on Her and American Hustle. In June 2014, Ellison optioned the screen rights for the memoir A House in the Sky, which tells the story of Amanda Lindhout and her capture by Somali rebels in 2011.

Also in 2014, Ellison was included as part of The Advocate'''s annual "40 Under 40" list.

Approach to production
Ellison has a particular taste in directors. Ellison's approach to working with critically acclaimed directors is purely focused on ensuring that their creative vision is met, and providing them with all the relevant resources. Ellison is criticized by the film industry for being too ambitious and excessive with her budgets on films. With a proposed budget of $35 million, Paul Thomas Anderson's film The Master was initially denied by Universal and was deemed "too risky and rich for their blood." Indiewire says, "With the project adrift, Ellison's Annapurna Pictures stepped in and with distribution by The Weinstein Company, funded and helped bring The Master to the screen for $35 million (though some reports suggest that number is closer to $40 million)." With The Master making $28 million worldwide, Ellison lost as much as $15 million on the project. Ellison is heavily involved with the production of the films she finances by being on the set and making sure everything goes as planned. Ellison was present for  Zero Dark Thirty's production as it was brought to a halt because of sandstorms and had to abort a location due to an anti Pakistan riot in India. Ellison's production style is holistically present and accommodating to directors' visions. Because of her wealth, Ellison does not approach film as an investment with high returns, but rather as an artistic medium pushing the boundaries of independent filmmaking.

Personal life
Ellison is openly lesbian. She owns a number of motorcycles. Ellison refused to give interviews. She is a competitive equestrian, having trained at the Wild Turkey Farm in Woodside, California and riding in the North American Young Rider Championships in 2004.

Annapurna Pictures
In 2011, Ellison founded the production company Annapurna Pictures, named for the Annapurna Circuit she hiked in Nepal in 2006. It has produced the major films Spike Jonze's Her, Kathryn Bigelow's Zero Dark Thirty, and David O. Russell's American Hustle''. Ellison's approach to filmmaking is regarded as one that follows Silicon Valley principles: investing large sums of money into prestigious teams that are attempting something risky. Several executives, including two-year president Mark Weinstock, left Annapurna in 2018. Annapurna is backed by Ellison's billionaire father.

Ellison is the first female producer to earn two different Academy Awards nominations for Best Picture in the same year. In 2018, Ellison won the Woman in Motion Award at Cannes Music Festival.

Filmography

As producer

References

External links

Year of birth missing (living people)
Living people
American film producers
American billionaires
American people of Italian descent
American people of Russian-Jewish descent
People from Santa Clara County, California
Film producers from California
American film studio executives
American women film producers
LGBT film producers
LGBT people from California
American lesbian artists
Golden Globe Award-winning producers
University of Southern California people
Schools of the Sacred Heart alumni
American independent film production company founders
Tony Award winners